GSC 03549-02811 (sometimes referred to as TrES-2 A or TrES-2 parent star in reference to its exoplanet TrES-2b), also known as Kepler-1) is a yellow main-sequence star similar to the Sun. This star is located approximately 704 light-years away in the constellation of Draco. The apparent magnitude of this star is 11.41, which means it is not visible to the naked eye but can be seen with a medium-sized amateur telescope on a clear dark night. The age of this star is about 5 billion years.

Planetary system
In 2006 the exoplanet TrES-2b was discovered by the TrES program using the transit method. It is also within the field of view of the previously operational Kepler Mission planet-hunter spacecraft. This system continues to be studied by other projects and the parameters are continuously improved. The planet orbits the primary star.

Though TrES-2b is currently the darkest known exoplanet, reflecting less than 1 percent of local sunlight, it shows a faint red glow. This is because its surface is 1,100 °C, it is so hot that it glows red. It is assumed to be tidally locked to its parent star.

Binary star
In 2008 a study was undertaken of fourteen stars with exoplanets that were originally discovered using the transit method through relatively small telescopes. These systems were re-examined with the 2.2M reflector telescope at the Calar Alto Observatory in Spain. This star system, along with two others, was determined to be a previously unknown binary star system. The previously unknown secondary star is a dim magnitude 15 K-type star separated by about 232 AU from the primary, appearing offset from the primary by about one arc second in the images. This discovery resulted in a significant recalculation of parameters for both the planet and the primary star.

The Kepler mission

In March 2009 NASA launched the Kepler spacecraft. This spacecraft was a dedicated mission to discover extrasolar planets by the transit method from solar orbit. In April 2009 the project released the first light images from the spacecraft and TrES-2b was one of two objects highlighted in these images. Although TrES-2b is not the only known exoplanet in the field of view of this spacecraft it is the only one identified in the first-light images. This object is important for calibration and check-out.

See also
 Trans-Atlantic Exoplanet Survey or TrES
 List of extrasolar planets

References

External links
 
 

Draco (constellation)
Planetary transit variables
Planetary systems with one confirmed planet
G-type main-sequence stars
Binary stars
1
2
K-type main-sequence stars